Göttler or Gottler is a German language surname from the personal name Gottfried. Notable people with the name include:
 Archie Gottler (1896–1959), American composer, screenwriter, actor, and film director
 Vilmos Göttler (1951), Hungarian equestrian

References 

German-language surnames
Surnames from given names